The following is a list of former privately run transit companies that served Dallas, Texas. The first year is the year service began. The last is the year private service was halted.

1872–1884 Dallas City Railroad Company (Main Street Line)
1875–1884 Dallas Street Railroad Company (San Jacinto Line)
1876–1887 Commerce and Ervay Street Railroad Company
1884–1887 Belt Street Railway
1884–1887 Dallas City and Dallas Street Railroad Company (merger between the Main and San Jacinto Lines)
1887–1890 Dallas Consolidated Street Railway Company (merger between the DC&DS, C&E and BSR)
1887–1900 Dallas and Oak Cliff Elevated Railway
1888–1898 Dallas Rapid Transit Company
1889–1892 North Dallas Circuit Railway
1890– North Dallas Railway Company
1890–1895 Dallas Consolidated Traction Railway Company (New owners changed the DCSR)
1892–1898 Queens City Railway Company
1895–1898 Dallas City Railway Company (New Company formed to take ownership of DCTRC, which went into receivership)
1898–1917 Dallas Consolidated and Electric Street Railway Company (acquired disposed property of the DCRC along with the QCRC)
1899–1917 Rapid Transit Railway Company (acquired the DRTC)
1900–1917 Northern Texas Traction Company (acquired the D&OCER)
 –1917 Metropolitan Street Railway Company
1917–1926 Dallas Railway Company (merger of DC&ESRC, RTRC and MSRC as well as leasing of lines along the NTTC in Oak Cliff)
1926–1956 Dallas Railway and Terminal Company (Name change from the DRC)
1956–1964 Dallas Transit Company (Name change from DR&T. In 1964, the city purchased the DTC, ending a 92-year run of private transit companies in Dallas)

See also 
 Current and Former Railroad Companies Operating in Dallas, Texas

Transportation in Dallas
Dallas, Texas
 Transit
Transit companies in Dallas, Texas
Transit
Lists of companies based in Texas